Delyan Dobrev (born 1977 or 1978) is a Bulgarian politician. He was the Deputy Bulgarian Minister of Economy and Energy under Traycho Traykov, succeeding him as Minister in March 2012 following an energy crisis in the country which included the alleged termination of the Belene Nuclear Power Plant project and the resignation of Traykov.

Currently Dobrev is an MP from Citizens for European Development of Bulgaria.

According to published reports, "Dobrev graduated in economics in 2002 from Wesleyan University, Middletown, Connecticut in the United States. He specialised [sic] in accounting and finance at the London School of Economics."

References

Government ministers of Bulgaria
Living people
1977 births
Wesleyan University alumni
Alumni of the London School of Economics